Jorge Galán Anaut (born 22 January 1989) is a Spanish professional footballer who plays for Racing Rioja CF as a forward.

Club career
Born in Pamplona, Navarre, Galán made his professional – and La Liga – debut for hometown's CA Osasuna on 23 September 2009, in a game at Real Valladolid: replacing Carlos Aranda in the 70th minute, he scored the 2–1 winner in the next. He played a further 19 league matches during the season, all as a substitute.

In mid-July 2010, a season-loan deal was arranged for Galán, as he joined Segunda División club SD Huesca. He appeared in less than one third of the league matches for the Aragonese during his spell, also failing to find the net in just 479 minutes of play.

Galán signed for Scottish Premier League side Kilmarnock on 12 August 2011, on loan. He made his debut as a substitute two days later, in a 4–1 home victory against Hibernian.

In late January 2012, after only five official appearances for the Killie, Galán returned to his country and joined, still owned by Osasuna, Real Unión in Segunda División B. He continued competing in the third tier the following years, representing Atlético Levante UD and again Unión.

References

External links

1989 births
Living people
Spanish footballers
Footballers from Pamplona
Association football forwards
La Liga players
Segunda División players
Segunda División B players
Tercera División players
Segunda Federación players
CA Osasuna B players
CA Osasuna players
SD Huesca footballers
Atlético Levante UD players
Real Unión footballers
Racing Rioja CF players
Scottish Premier League players
Kilmarnock F.C. players
Spain youth international footballers
Spanish expatriate footballers
Expatriate footballers in Scotland
Spanish expatriate sportspeople in Scotland